Psalm 30 is the 30th psalm of the Book of Psalms, beginning in English in the King James Version: "I will extol thee, O ; for thou hast lifted me up". The Book of Psalms is part of the third section of the Hebrew Bible, and a book of the Christian Old Testament. In the slightly different numbering system used in the Greek Septuagint version of the Bible and in the Latin Vulgate, this psalm is Psalm 29. In Latin, it is known as "Exaltabo te Domine". It is a psalm of thanksgiving, traditionally ascribed to David upon the building of his own royal palace.

The psalm is a regular part of Jewish, Catholic, Lutheran, Anglican and other Protestant liturgies. It has inspired hymns based on it, and has been set to music.

Text

Hebrew Bible version
Following is the Hebrew text of Psalm 30:

King James Version
 I will extol thee, O ; for thou hast lifted me up, and hast not made my foes to rejoice over me.
 O  my God, I cried unto thee, and thou hast healed me.
 O , thou hast brought up my soul from the grave: thou hast kept me alive, that I should not go down to the pit.
 For his anger endureth but a moment; in his favour is life: weeping may endure for a night, but joy cometh in the morning.
 And in my prosperity I said, I shall never be moved.
 , by thy favour thou hast made my mountain to stand strong: thou didst hide thy face, and I was troubled.
 I cried to thee, O ; and unto the  I made supplication.
 What profit is there in my blood, when I go down to the pit? Shall the dust praise thee? shall it declare thy truth?
 Hear, O , and have mercy upon me: , be thou my helper.
 Thou hast turned for me my mourning into dancing: thou hast put off my sackcloth, and girded me with gladness;
 To the end that my glory may sing praise to thee, and not be silent. O  my God, I will give thanks unto thee for ever.

Theme 
It is a psalm of thanksgiving, traditionally ascribed to David upon the building of his own royal palace. David dedicated his life work to be completed by his son, who built the "Hallowed House",   Solomon's Temple. It is Solomon and his lineage, not the building, which in later sources are called the House of David.

 , from the same root as Hanukkah, is the name for Jewish education, emphasizing ethical training and discipline.

Liturgical use in Judaism
 This psalm is a part of daily prayer in some rites. It was originally recited in Pesukei dezimra, a section of the Shacharit prayer, in the Sephardic rite, in which they omit the first verse. From there, it seems to have made its way in the 17th century to Nusach Sefard, in which they added the first verse, and from there it was adopted in the Eastern Ashkenazic rite. It is not recited in the Western Ashkenazic rite, the Italian rite or the Yemenite rite. The purpose of this was to dedicate the morning temple service.
 Psalm 30 is also considered the psalm for the day of Hanukkah, and some communities recite it in addition to, or instead of, the regular Psalm of the day.
 There are many traditional and contemporary melodies for this psalm that are sung or recited especially during Hanukkah.
 Psalm 30 in Vizhnitz melody, by Invitation to Piyut
 Psalm 30 by R. Avner Yemini and congregation
 Verse 12 is found in the prayers recited following Motzei Shabbat Maariv.
 Verse 13 is part of Uva Letzion.

Christian uses
Augustine saw the psalm David wrote of the founding of the house as pointing to the resurrection of Christ and the foundation of God's house, the church.

In the Catholic Church, Psalm 30 is appointed to be read at Lauds (Morning Prayer) on Thursday in the first week of the month. 

In the Church of England's Book of Common Prayer, this psalm is appointed to be read on the morning of the sixth day of the month
In the Church of England's Book of Common Prayer, this psalm is appointed to be read on the morning of the sixth day of the month.

Verse 5 is used in the Jesus Culture song "Your Love Never Fails".

Musical settings 
Heinrich Schütz wrote a setting of a metric paraphrase of Psalm 30 in German, "Ich preis dich, Herr, zu aller Stund", SWV 127, for the Becker Psalter, published first in 1628.

References

External links 

 
 
  in Hebrew and English – Mechon-mamre
 Psalm 30 – Remembering the Greatness of God at a Great Event text and detailed commentary, enduringword.com
 A psalm. A song for the dedication of the Temple.* Of David. / I praise you, LORD, for you raised me up text and footnotes, usccb.org United States Conference of Catholic Bishops
 Psalm 30:1 introduction and text, biblestudytools.com
 Psalm 30 / Refrain: You brought me up, O Lord, from the dead. Church of England
 Psalm 30 at biblegateway.com
 Hymns for Psalm 30 hymnary.org
 Hebrew text, translation, transliteration for verses 9 and 11 on The Zemirot Database

030
Pesukei dezimra
Siddur of Orthodox Judaism
Works attributed to David